Bluemantle Pursuivant of Arms in Ordinary is a junior officer of arms  of the College of Arms in London.  The office is reputed to have been created by King Henry V to serve the Order of the Garter, but there is no documentary evidence of this.  There is, however, mention of an officer styled Blewmantle going to France in 1448.  The first Bluemantle to be mentioned by name is found in a record from around 1484.  The badge of office, probably derived from the original blue material of the Order of the Garter, is blazoned as A Blue Mantle lined Ermine cords and tassels Or.

The current Bluemantle Pursuivant is Mark John Rosborough Scott who was appointed 13 June 2019.

Holders of the office

See also
 Heraldry
 Officer of Arms

References
Citations

Bibliography
 The College of Arms, Queen Victoria Street : being the sixteenth and final monograph of the London Survey Committee, Walter H. Godfrey, assisted by Sir Anthony Wagner, with a complete list of the officers of arms, prepared by H. Stanford London, (London, 1963)
 A History of the College of Arms &c, Mark Noble, (London, 1804)

External links
The College of Arms
CUHGS Officer of Arms Index

Offices of the College of Arms